Glenn D. Lid (born 1957) is an American teacher.

Biography
Lid was born in Chicago. He was inducted into the National Teachers Hall of Fame in 2012. He won a Disney Award in 2004, as the Disney Secondary Teacher of The Year. He was a guest on the Tony Danza Show and Chicago Fox Morning News in 2004. He was named a Golden Apple Teacher of Distinction in 2007. He received the Davidson Award from the Chemical Industry Council of Illinois in 2007

Honors and recognition
National Teachers Hall of Fame in 2012
Disney High School Teacher Of The Year in 2004

References 

1957 births
Living people
People from Chicago
Elmhurst College alumni
Educators from Illinois